George Alexander Bryson Kynoch OBE (born 7 October 1946), is a Scottish Conservative politician.

At the 1992 general election, he was elected as MP for Kincardine and Deeside, defeating the Liberal Democrat Nicol Stephen, who had gained the seat at a by-election in 1991. From 1995 to 1997, he was a junior Scottish Office minister. Since 1997, Kynoch has held several non-executive director positions in AIM-listed and private companies.

Kynoch's seat was abolished in boundary changes for the 1997 general election; he contested the new seat of Aberdeenshire West and Kincardine but lost to the Liberal Democrat Sir Robert Smith.

In May 2008, Kynoch was elected as Deputy Chairman of the Scottish Conservatives. He was re-elected in 2010 and held office till 2012.

Kynoch was appointed Officer of the Order of the British Empire (OBE) in the 2013 New Year Honours, for public and political service.

Footnotes

References
 "Times Guide to the House of Commons", Times Newspapers Limited, 1992 and 1997 editions.

External links 
 

1946 births
Living people
Officers of the Order of the British Empire
Scottish Conservative Party MPs
UK MPs 1992–1997